Fredrick Pinder (January 5, 1891 – March 5, 1955) was an American Negro league shortstop in the 1910s.

A native of Philadelphia, Pennsylvania, Pinder played for the Hilldale Club in 1917. In his nine recorded games, he posted nine hits in 37 plate appearances. Pinder died in La Mott, Pennsylvania in 1955 at age 64.

References

External links
 and Seamheads

1891 births
1955 deaths
Hilldale Club players
Baseball shortstops
Baseball players from Philadelphia
20th-century African-American sportspeople